Peter George Thomas Davies (born 1 September 1976) is a former English cricketer.  Davies was a right-handed batsman who played primarily as a wicketkeeper.  He was born at Derby, Derbyshire.

Davies represented the Derbyshire Cricket Board in a single List A match against Derbyshire in the 2000 NatWest Trophy.  During this match he was dismissed for a duck by Tim Munton.

References

External links
Peter Davies at CricketArchive

1976 births
Living people
Cricketers from Derby
English cricketers
Derbyshire Cricket Board cricketers
Alumni of Loughborough University
Wicket-keepers